Jihad Azour, (born 4 May 1966), is a Lebanese economist and politician, he served as Lebanon's minister of finance under Fouad Saniora's government from 2005 to 2008.

Education
Azour obtained his PhD (with high honours) in International Finance from the Institut d'Etudes Politiques de Paris (IEP) in France in 1996. While completing his PhD, he served as post doctoral fellow at Harvard University's Department of Economics researching the integration of emerging economies in the global economy. Azour also holds a post-graduate degree in International Economic and Finance (with honours), and a Master's in Applied Economics from Dauphine University, Paris, France. The thesis he wrote then was awarded the best student research in 1987 by INSEE (the French National Institute for Statistics and Economic Studies).

Career
Jihad Azour was the Minister of Finance of Lebanon for three years (2005–2008). He spearheaded the economic and financial program of the Lebanese Government, and coordinated the implementation of the various policies and reform initiatives. He led the preparation and the implementation of the Paris III International Conference for Lebanon, gathered more than 45 countries and IFIs, and raised US$7.6 billion of support. Jihad Azour also conducted a comprehensive modernization and reform agenda in the Ministry of Finance. The reform program was granted in 2007 the prestigious "United Nations Public Service Award".

Since 2009, Jihad Azour is member of the IMF Advisory Group for the Middle East – MEAG.
He was appointed in 2012 by the President of the World Bank, member of the Independent Panel of Experts to review a broad range of issues around the Doing Business and Global Competitiveness.
Azour also chaired the G8-MENA Ministerial Group for 2006–2008, which regroups ministers of Finance and central bank governors of the G8 and MENA countries.

Jihad Azour was managing director of Inventis Partners- a Private Equity and Advisory Firm (which he founded), with investments in MENA and Europe. Until the end of 2012, he was a V.P. – senior executive advisor at Booz & Company, actively involved in consulting governments, public sector organizations, central banks, financial sector and institutions, large international corporations and conglomerates.
He occupied senior positions in government (minister of finance for 3 years), UNDP, and in leading private sector companies (including McKinsey and Company, Booz Allen Hamilton, and Compagnie de Saint-Gobain). He also consulted for the IMF, the World Bank and the EU. Azour published more than five books and several articles on economic and financial issues in international publications and academic journals, and has a long teaching experience at the American University of Beirut.

Jihad Azour sits on the board of various companies, universities and social institutions, among them:
- CMA – CGM Group (third largest international shipping company),
-  Carnegie Middle East Advisory Council
- Lebanese American University – chairman of the board of International Advisors and member of the board of Trustees
- Iktissad Wal Aamal Group – member of the board of directors.
He has also pioneered various projects and initiatives: Chairman of Mobile Innovation Hub, MiHub – A joint program with the World Bank Group to promote startups and technology sector in Lebanon, the Young Lebanese Entrepreneurs Program – BADER, to support Lebanese entrepreneurs.
Jihad Azour is a Chevalier dans l’Ordre National de la Légion d'honneur in France.

Azour's involvement in government began in 1999 as project director of the United Nations Development Programme (UNDP) Project at the Ministry of Finance, and as senior advisor to the Minister of Finance with Georges Corm (until October 2000) and Fuad Siniora (October 2000 – October 2004). During this assignment Azour supervised and managed all reform projects within the various departments of the Ministry of Finance covering income tax modernization, budget and accounting reform, treasury management reform, debt management reform, and the automation of registry and cadastre operation. It was also during this time that the Value Added Tax was introduced.

Azour also worked on mobilizing and coordinating a program of technical assistance from several international and bilateral organizations, managed the Lebanese Government's liability and external borrowing program through the international capital markets and led an effort at the Ministry of Finance to modernize Lebanese capital markets through the listing more than 12 Eurobonds issued by the Lebanese Republic on the Beirut Stock Exchange (a first in the region). It was also during this period that Azour introduced measures to improve transparency at the Ministry of Finance through different means by disseminating fiscal information through an increase in the number of reports and publications, workshops, conference, and the development of websites.

Jihad Azour has also worked in the private sector with notable management consultancy firms. He served as a specialized management consultant with McKinsey and Company (1989–1993), as managing partner of AM&F Consulting (a management consulting firm specialized in emerging markets' financial sector) (1996–1998), and as Subject Matter Expert with Booz Allen Hamilton (January – June 2005).  Azour also consulted for the International Monetary Fund's Fiscal Affairs Department (February – March 2005) on reforming Qatar's tax structure.
Azour has taught courses at the American University of Beirut on "Macroeconomic management in Lebanon" (2004), and on "Modern Commercial Banks' Management" (1998–2000).

During the period from July 2005 till July 2008, Jihad Azour served as Lebanon's minister of finance. When he was in office, he focused on formulating, implementing and monitoring an economic and social reform program that was presented by the government at the International Conference for Support to Lebanon-Paris III, which resulted in support from the international community worth US$7.6 billion in pledges. He also focused on maintaining financial stability given the trying political, security and economic challenges in Lebanon which have characterized his term in office.

During his term, the ministry witnessed wide-ranging and effective implementation of reforms These have been cross-cutting and include undertaking revenue-management and administrative reform towards a function-based structure, undertaking budget and financial management reform, strengthening debt management, reforming capital markets, facilitating trade and customs procedures, modernizing cadastre operations, improving the business environment, enhancing donor coordination capacity building and human resource upgrading, and upgrading and automating IT infrastructure.

Jihad Azour attached importance to implementing the transparency strategy of the ministry of finance. He initiated the publication of pertinent reports including establishing a quarterly meeting with donors and publishing a quarterly report on the status of the pledges made at the Paris III conference, on the use of funds, and on the progress made to the economic and social reform program. During Azour's term, the fiscal accounts of the Lebanese government for the period 1993-2006 were audited and published, for the first time by any government in Lebanon.

Initiatives spearheaded by Azour included institutionalizing dialogue with the private sector which resulted in the simplification of several finance, customs and tax procedures. Azour was also passionate promoter of youth empowerment initiatives and spearheaded such initiatives as the BADER Young Entrepreneurs Program, and the Youth Economic Forum.

In 2007, the ministry of finance was awarded the prestigious United Nations Public Service Award for the category "Improving the Delivery of Services." Azour's work as Finance Minister, and in his former role as advisor, had worked on the reforms in building a modern tax administration and in what is considered a successful VAT introduction which led to the award.

In 2016, IMF Managing Director, Christine Lagarde, appointed Azour the IMF Director of the Middle East and Central Asia department; he assumed the position on 1 March 2017.

Publications
Jihad Azour's publications include:

§	In French:

"Délits d'Initiés en Europe", Le Monde Editions (1994), in collaboration with Mss C. Ducouloux-Favard (Lawyer, Professor in University of Paris IX-Dauphine), Book on insider trading in Europe.
"Déontologie et Droit des Activités Financières", Le Monde Editions (1994), in collaboration with Ms A. Pezard (Judge, Advisor of the Director of Treasury), Book on ethics and regulations in finance.
"Rapport sur l'Argent dans le Monde- 1995 and 1996", editor and contributor, REF Editions.

§	In English:

"Fighting Money Laundering", Booklet for the Lebanese Banking Association (June 1997).
"Fiduciary Operations: Legal, Economic, Financial, Regulatory, and Tax aspects", Book co-author, Banque du Liban (1999).
"Linking Economic Growth and Social Development in Lebanon", Report co-author, UNDP (2000).
Numerous articles and research papers on financial issues in different publications including: Revue Banque, Revue d'Economie Financière, Le Monde, Marchés et techniques financières, Emerging Lebanon – Oxford Business Group, the Daily Star, Le Commerce du Levant, An-Nahar.

In addition, Jihad Azour organized and led several conferences and seminars, including contributing, as a speaker, to various conferences and workshops.

Personal life
Prior to becoming Minister of Finance, Azour was an active member of La Fassad, the Lebanese chapter of Transparency International, from 2003. He is also the founding member of the Lebanon chapter of the Young Arab Leaders. Jihad Azour is married to Rola Rizk and has two sons, Jad And Karim Azour. He is the Nephew of the late MP and Former Minister Jean Obeid.

References

External links

1966 births
Living people
Harvard University staff
Finance ministers of Lebanon
Lebanese Maronites